Michael Roberts (6 December 1902 – 13 December 1948), originally named William Edward Roberts, was an English poet, writer, scientist, mathematician, critic and broadcaster, a true polymath who made his living as a teacher.

Life

He was born in Bournemouth, named William Edward Roberts. He was the eldest child of Edward George Roberts (b. 7 January 1878, d. 14 March 1954) and Henrietta Mary Sellers (b. 23 March 1880, d. 28 June 1918 following the birth of a son nine days earlier). They had a farm in the New Forest. He was educated at Bournemouth School. From 1920 to 1922 he studied at King's College London, taking a BSc in Chemistry. From 1922 to 1925 he read mathematics at Trinity College, Cambridge; it was during this period of his life he acquired the name Michael (after Mikhail Lomonosov). In 1925 or 1926 he joined the Communist Party of Great Britain but was expelled within a year.

From 1925 to 1931 he taught at the Royal Grammar School, Newcastle. Afterwards, he moved to London, teaching at Mercers' School from 1931 to 1934. He then returned to the RGS, where he worked until 1941, teaching English, mathematics, physics and chemistry. Having published his first poetry collection in 1930, he began to edit anthologies, of which New Country (1933) was celebrated for the group of poets (including W. H. Auden) that it featured. In 1934, he participated in a high-profile series of radio broadcasts, Whither Britain?, together with major figures such as Winston Churchill and Ernest Bevin.

The next year, he married Janet Adam Smith, critic, anthologist, and fellow mountaineer; they lived in Fern Avenue, Jesmond, Newcastle upon Tyne. In 1939 they went to Penrith in Cumberland when the school was evacuated there. There they briefly shared a house with the poet Kathleen Raine. Together, they had four children: Andrew Roberts, Professor of the History of Africa at the University of London, born 1937; Henrietta Dombey, Professor of Literacy in Primary Education at the University of Brighton, born 1939; Adam Roberts, Professor of International Relations at Oxford University, born 1940; and John Roberts, writer on energy issues and Middle East politics, born 1947.

The Faber Book of Modern Verse (1936), which he edited, is the single piece of work for which Roberts is now best remembered. He followed it with poetry and prose writing, and a study of T. E. Hulme. In 1941-5 he worked in London for the BBC European Service, mainly on broadcasting to German-occupied countries. From 1945 to 1948 he was Principal of the College of St Mark and St John in Chelsea, London, where one of his colleagues was the biologist Cyril Bibby. He died of leukaemia in 1948.

Michael and Janet Roberts had built up a large collection of books on mountaineering, which (along with the collection of the Oxford University Mountaineering Club) provided a basis for establishment in December 1992 of the 
Oxford Mountaineering Library. From 2019 this is based in the Geography collections in the Social Science Library, which is in the Manor Road Building, Oxford OX1 3UQ.

Many of his papers are in the National Library of Scotland, at Edinburgh. They include literary correspondence, and also records of his BBC service in 1941–5.

Poets in New Signatures (1932)

W. H. Auden, Julian Bell, C. Day-Lewis, Richard Eberhart, William Empson, John Lehmann, William Plomer, Stephen Spender, A. S. J. Tessimond

Poets in New Country (1933)

W. H. Auden, Richard Goodman, C. Day-Lewis, John Lehmann, Charles Madge, Michael Roberts, Stephen Spender, A. S. J. Tessimond, Rex Warner

Books by Michael Roberts

 These Our Matins (poems), Elkin Mathews & Marrot, London, 1930.
 (ed.) New Signatures: Poems by Several Hands, Hogarth Press, London, 1932.
 (ed.) New Country: Prose and Poetry by the authors of New Signatures, Hogarth Press, London, 1933.
 (ed.) Elizabethan Prose, London, Jonathan Cape, 1933.
 (with E.R. Thomas) Newton and the Origin of Colours: A Study of One of the Earliest Examples of Scientific Method, G. Bell, London, 1934.
 Critique of Poetry, Jonathan Cape, London, 1934.
 Poems, Jonathan Cape, London, 1936.
 (ed.) The Faber Book of Modern Verse, Faber & Faber, London, 1936.
 The Modern Mind, Faber & Faber, London, 1937.
 T.E. Hulme, Faber & Faber, London, 1938.
 Orion Marches (poems), Faber & Faber, London, 1939.
 The Recovery of the West, Faber & Faber, London, 1941.
 (ed.) The Faber Book of Comic Verse, Faber & Faber, London, 1942.
 The Estate of Man, Faber & Faber, London, 1951.
 Collected Poems, Faber & Faber, London, 1958.

Examples of Work

La Meije 1937: A poem written in the late 1930's reflecting the Author's love of climbing, the euphoria and the reflection of the final parts of a descent from a good climb. It was dedicated to his friend, climbing partner,  Alpine guide and founder of the Summer Ski School of Colle del Gigante (now called the Mont Blanc Ski School); Ottone Bron.

La Meije 1937<ref>Orion Marches (poems), Faber & Faber, London, 1939.</ref>For Ottone Bron: Killed on the Col du Geant, 1938Going down from the Aiguilles d'Arves, towards la Grave,

With sunlight on the cornsheaves, and the evening voices,

The fields already ripe with autumn crocus,

We said nothing, but saw the Meije rise up across the valley.

That was a climb for the next day, or the next;

That was our country, there, high up,

A world barely older than ourselves, and none too easy;

But now we going down to the valley,

Going down among the hotels and the autocars,

Going down among the young men in flannels, and the fat mammas,

Sightseers like ourselves, but easily contented,

Speaking more kindly of us then we of them.

This was our pleasure: to climb among the loose stones, to cut steps in ice,

To find a new alternative to the mauvais pasTheirs was simpler, and we despised it.

Perhaps we were right:

A man should use every nerve and muscle,

A man should puzzle out the hardest questions,

A man should find words for thoughts that no one knows.

At any rate, there was no room for us in at the big hotel.

But the fields were filled with sunlight,

We clattered noisily through the upper hamlets,

Girls turned for a moment from the milking,

And a boy with six goats shouted a greeting,

To us, the intruders.

Already Said My Host.: One of Mr Roberts' final poems; where the issue of his progressing illness and unavoidable conclusion are addressed:

Already Said My Host.

'Already', said my host. 'You have arrived already?

But by what route, what ingenious raccourci?

I half expected you, it is true,

But I expected someone a little older,

Someone rather less arrogant and impulsive,

Someone a little embittered and despondent,

Someone, in short, not quite you.

And now you arrive by some unfair expedient,

Having neglected, no doubt, to pay proper attention to the view:

You arrive a little dazed and flushed,

And you find me hardly ready to receive you, hardly able to cope.

It was inconsiderate of you to die so suddenly,

Placing me in this ridiculous quandary.

I had predicted a great future for you,

A future without happiness or hope:

I had prepared a suitable mausoleum for your reception:

And now you arrive with a bundle of daffodils, a fox terrier,

And a still unfinished smile.

Really!'

References

Other sources

 Frederick Grubb (ed.), Michael Roberts: Selected Poems and Prose, Carcanet Press, 1980.
 Michael H. Whitworth, Physics and the Literary Community, 1905-1939, unpublished Oxford D.Phil. thesis, 1994. Contains checklist of Roberts's contributions to periodicals, includes items not listed in Grubb's bibliography.
 Samuel Hines, entry on Michael Roberts in the Oxford Dictionary of National Biography, Oxford University Press, 2004; online edition October 2009.
 Jason Harding, The Criterion: Cultural Politics and Periodical Networks in Inter-war Britain, Oxford University Press, 2002.  (Chapter 8, pp. 159–174, 'Michael Roberts and Janet Adam Smith: New Signatures'.) .
 Nicolas Barker, obituary: "Janet Adam Smith: A Woman of Substance in Literature and Mountaineering", The Guardian, London, 14 September 1999.
 Leonard Miall, "Obituary: Janet Adam Smith", The Independent'', London, 13 September 1999.

External links

1902 births
1948 deaths
Alumni of King's College London
Alumni of Trinity College, Cambridge
Writers from Bournemouth
20th-century English poets